Haimbachia aculeata is a moth in the family Crambidae. It was described by George Hampson in 1903. It is found in the Indian state of Sikkim and in South Africa.

References

Haimbachiini
Moths described in 1903